Zarang Mahalleh (also Romanized as Zarang Maḩalleh) is a village in Chapar Khaneh Rural District, Khomam District, Rasht County, Gilan Province, Iran. At the 2006 census, its population was 485, in 133 families.

References 

Populated places in Rasht County